Public Domain Mark (PDM) is a symbol used to indicate that a work is free of known copyright restrictions and therefore in the public domain. It is analogous to the copyright symbol, which is commonly used to indicate that a work is copyrighted, often as part of a copyright notice. The Public Domain Mark was developed by Creative Commons and is only an indicator of the public domain status of a work – it itself does not release a copyrighted work into the public domain like CC0.

As there is no single definition of public domain and copyright laws differ by jurisdiction, a work can be in the public domain in some countries while still being under copyright in others (so called hybrid status). It is also difficult to assess the legal status of many works. The PDM is recommended to be used only for works that are likely free from any copyright restrictions worldwide.

See also 
 CC0
 Public Domain
 Wikimedia Commons category containing media files marked with the Public Domain Mark

References

External links 

 Public Domain Mark

Creative Commons
Public domain